This is a list of the National Register of Historic Places listings in Liberty County, Texas.

This is intended to be a complete list of properties listed on the National Register of Historic Places in Liberty County, Texas. There are six properties listed on the National Register in the county. Two properties are also Recorded Texas Historic Landmarks.

Current listings

The publicly disclosed locations of National Register properties may be seen in a mapping service provided.

|}

See also

National Register of Historic Places listings in Texas
Recorded Texas Historic Landmarks in Liberty County

References

External links

Liberty County, Texas
Liberty County
Buildings and structures in Liberty County, Texas